Ivana Filipović (born 9 November 1989 in Novi Sad, SR Serbia, Yugoslavia) is a rower from Serbia.

At the 2011 World Rowing U23 Championships in Amsterdam, she won 4th place in Single Sculls event.

Filipović won the silver medal in the Women's Double Sculls event at the 2011 European Rowing Championships in Plovdiv, Bulgaria

References

1989 births
Living people
Serbian female rowers
Sportspeople from Novi Sad
European Rowing Championships medalists